The Treaty of London (1358) known as the first Treaty of London (May 1358), was signed during the Hundred Years' War, between the English and French.

Edward III of England's  son, Edward the Black Prince, invaded France from English-held Gascony in 1356, winning a victory at the Battle of Poitiers. During the battle, the Gascon noble Jean III de Grailly, captal de Buch, captured the French king, John II, and many of his nobles. At the instigation of the Pope, negotiations were opened, resulting in a truce on 13 March 1357. The Black Prince brought John to London where negotiations continued, and the First treaty of London was signed in May 1358.

The truce set John's ransom at four million écus. The treaty was never implemented, largely because the French did not raise the first installment of the ransom. However, negotiations resumed that extended the truce and eventually led to the second treaty of London.

See also
Hundred Years' War
List of treaties
Treaties of London

Notes

References

 

1358 in England
14th century in London
1350s in France
London (1358)
London
London (1358)
London
London (1358)
Edward III of England
Edward the Black Prince
Hundred Years' War, 1337–1360